Herbertus is a genus of liverworts in the family Herbertaceae. The genus has a broad global distribution, including sixteen species that occur in Eurasia:
Herbertus aduncus (Dicks.) Gray – North America and East Asia
Herbertus armitanus (Steph.) H.A. Mill. – Indochina to Papua New Guinea
Herbertus borealis Crundw. – Beinn Eighe, Scotland
Herbertus buchii Juslén – Amur Province, Russia 
Herbertus ceylanicus (Steph.) Abeyw. – Sri Lanka, Indonesia, Malaysia
Herbertus circinatus (Steph.) H.A. Mill. – Indonesia, Malaysia, Papua New Guinea and the Philippines
Herbertus dicranus (Taylor ex Gottsche et al.) Trevis – western North America, East Asia, East Africa
Herbertus guangdongii P.J. Lin & Piippo – Hainan Island, China
Herbertus hutchinsiae (Gottsche) A. Evans – Ireland to Norway
Herbertus kurzii (Steph.) R.S. Chopra – China, Bhutan, India and Nepal
Herbertus longispinus Jack & Steph. – Taiwan, Indonesia, Malaysia and the Philippines
Herbertus norenus D.G.Long, D.Bell & H.H.Blom – Shetland and Norway
Herbertus pilifer (Steph.) H.A. Mill. – Indonesia, Malaysia and Papua New Guinea
Herbertus ramosus (Steph.) H.A. Mill. – Sri Lanka, Thailand, Vietnam, Indonesia and Papua New Guinea
Herbertus sendtneri (Nees) Lindb. – Austrian Alps, Asia, North America
Herbertus stramineus (Dumort.) Trevis. – United Kingdom, Faroe Islands, Norway, Iceland and Alaska

References

Jungermanniales
Jungermanniales genera
Taxonomy articles created by Polbot